Olofstorp is a locality situated in Göteborg Municipality, Västra Götaland County, Sweden. It has 4,142 inhabitants (2020). There is an annual event held at the local farmyard, this event is called Bergumsdagen ("Bergum Day"). There is currently one school in Olofstorp: Bergumsskolan. Olofstorp has three restaurants, a kiosk, a 24-hour gym, and a flower shop. Lake Älsjön is located there and is a popular swimming site for inhabitants, there is a float with high diving boards

Notable former residents
Lotta Engberg, Swedish singer and television host.

References 

Populated places in Västra Götaland County
Populated places in Gothenburg Municipality